The United Kingdom of Great Britain and Ireland competed as Great Britain at the 1900 Summer Olympics in Paris, France.  It was the second appearance of Britain after having participated in the inaugural 1896 Games.  In Olympic competition, the nation has always shortened its official name to Great Britain rather than the United Kingdom seen elsewhere.

Medallists

Additionally British competitors won five gold medals, three silver medals and five bronze medals while competing for the Mixed Team.

Results by event

Swimming

Great Britain made its Olympic swimming debut in 1900. Jarvis won gold medals in each of the two long distance freestyle events; as neither distance was used again, he is the only Olympic champion ever in both the 1000 metres and 4000 metres. Kemp added a bronze in the obstacle event, another one-time-only competition. This put Great Britain at the top of the leaderboard by gold-silver-bronze (Australia and Germany also had 2 gold medals, but neither won any other medals) though France (1 gold, 2 silvers, 2 bronzes) and Austria (3 silvers, 1 bronze) had more total medals.

Water polo

The British water polo team won gold easily. The roster listed is that credited with gold medals by the IOC; the actual competition roster may have differed with up to five of the listed players not actually playing. One British player (Thomas William Burgess) played on a French team that won a bronze medal, as well, but the IOC credits that appearance to France and not Great Britain or a mixed team.

Athletics

Great Britain took 4 gold medals in athletics, including one as part of a mixed team (with 4 British athletes and one Australian).  This put them second on the leaderboard for that sport, behind the dominant United States as the two nations to win multiple gold medals in the sport.  The British team won a total of 9 athletics medals including a sweep of the 4000 metre steeplechase event.  9 athletes competed in 10 events.

 Track events

 Field events

Cricket

Great Britain was represented by the Devon and Somerset Wanderers in cricket in 1900.  The team won the only match, a 2-day 12-man contest, by 158 runs.

Cycling

Fencing

Great Britain send fencers to the Olympics for the first time in 1900. None of the 3 British men reached the final in their event.

Football

Upton Park F.C. represented Great Britain in the football competition.  The club squad won its only match, against Club Française, 4-0.

 Summary

 Match 1

Golf

Great Britain was one of four nations to compete in the first Olympic golf events.  The British golfers took the silver and bronze medals in the men's competition, making Great Britain the only nation other than the United States to win a golfing medal that year.

Gymnastics Artistic

Great Britain's second Olympic gymnastics appearance was no more successful than the nation's first, resulting in no medals.

Polo

Great Britain was one of four nations to compete in the first Olympic polo event.  British athletes played on three of the five teams, two of which included either American or French players, while the third included both American and French. The mixed British/American combination took the top place, the British/American/French team secured the silver medal, while the British/French team reached third place.

Rowing

Britain had a single rower present at the first Olympic rowing contests, winning the bronze medal in the single sculls event.

Rugby

Britain was one of three teams to compete in the first Olympic rugby games.  Britain lost its only game, against France.  The game against Germany was cancelled due to travel plans.

 Summary

 Match 2

 Roster

Sailing

Great Britain was second to France in gold medals at the 1900 sailing events with 4, but took only 1 other medal, a bronze.  France took 5 golds, 9 silvers, and 10 bronzes for a total of 24 medals to Britain's 6.  However, even a perfect performance by the British athletes would have earned only a total of 8 medals—Great Britain failed to medal in only 2 of its attempts. The crew members listed are those listed by the IOC in their database.
The Olympic historian Ian Buchanan in his book "British Olympians" (1991) states that "reports on many aspects of the 1900 regatta are inconclusive and the crew members of the British entry "Scotia" has never been positively settled. The records of the British Olympic Association give the crew as Lorne Currie, John Gretton and Linton Hope, but it has been established that Linton Hope was in England at the time of the races and his name only appears in the Olympic records as he was the designer of the "Scotia". Similarly the names of Currie and Gretton are probably only listed as the owners of the boat but as it is possible that they sailed their boat, they are listed as Olympic champions, although the participation of Lorne Currie, in particular, is in doubt. The one crew member whose participation has been established is Algernon Maudslay, whose name does not appear in any Olympic records, but from contemporary press reports it is clear that he was the helmsman of the "Scotia"".

 Single race events

 Regatta events

Shooting

Great Britain was represented by one shooter in its second appearance.  Merlin, who had competed for Great Britain four years earlier, competed again.  He tied for 7th in the trap shooting event.

Tennis

Great Britain competed in tennis for the second time in 1900, again with great success. The Doherty brothers, Reginald and Laurence, and Charlotte Cooper won all 4 gold medals. Harold Mahony took silver in the men's singles and was on a mixed-nationality team that earned silver in the mixed doubles. Great Britain also took both of the bronzes in the men's singles and one of the bronzes in the men's doubles, as well as having British players comprise half of each bronze-medal mixed doubles pair. Ultimately, each of the 6 British tennis players took at least 1 medal.

Reginald and Laurence Doherty refused to play each other prior to the final.  Since they were seeded in such a way that they would face each other in the semifinals, Reginald withdrew, accepting a bronze medal while Lawrence went on to win gold.

References

Nations at the 1900 Summer Olympics
1900
Olympics
Olympics